Southern Stars Club, also known as Stars of South or Noujoum Al Janoub, is a women's association football club based in Tayr Debba, Lebanon. Founded in 2018 as Terdeba Stars, they compete in the Lebanese Women's Football League.

History 
Southern Stars were founded on 1 August 2018 as Terdeba Stars, and first competed in the 2018–19 Lebanese Women's Football League; they finished in fourth place in Group A in their debut season. The following season, the club changed its name to Southern Stars, to appeal to a larger fanbase. They finished third in Group B, qualifying to the Final Eight where they finished sixth.

Players

Current squad

See also
 Lebanese Women's Football League
 Women's football in Lebanon
 List of women's association football clubs in Lebanon

References

Southern Stars Club
Women's football clubs in Lebanon
2018 establishments in Lebanon
Association football clubs established in 2018